This is a list of countries by apple production in 2016 and 2017, based on data from the Food and Agriculture Organization Corporate Statistical Database. The estimated total world production of apples in 2017 was 83,139,326 metric tonnes, down 2.4% from 85,204,410 tonnes in 2016.

List of countries by production quantity

>1,000,000 tonnes

100,000–1,000,000 tonnes

50,000–100,000 tonnes

10,000–50,000 tonnes

1,000–10,000 tonnes

<1,000 tonnes

List of countries by area harvested for apples 

This is a list of the top ten countries by area harvested for apples in hectares (ha). The total area harvested in the world for apples was 4,933,841 hectares in 2017, down 6.8% from 5,293,340 hectares in 2016.

Notes

References

External links
Fresh apples, production by country (sourced from the USDA)

Apple production
Apples
Apples